Napaeopsis is a genus of gastropods belonging to the family Enidae.

The species of this genus are found in the Balkans.

Species:

Napaeopsis cefalonica 
Napaeopsis mennoi 
Napaeopsis merditana 
Napaeopsis minima 
Napaeopsis ossica

References

Enidae